There are two types of prayer in the Baháʼí Faith: obligatory prayer and general or devotional prayer. Both types of prayer are composed of reverent words which are addressed to God, and the act of prayer is one of the most important Baháʼí laws for individual discipline. The purpose of prayer in the Baháʼí Faith is to grow closer to God and his Manifestation and to help better one's own conduct and to request divine assistance.

Baháʼís between the ages of 15 and 70 are required to perform one of three prescribed obligatory prayers daily and individually, according to a set form and in accordance with specific laws. In addition to the daily obligatory prayer, Baháʼí scripture directs believers daily to offer devotional prayer as well as to meditate and study sacred scripture. There is no set form for devotions and meditations.

There is a large corpus of devotional prayers written by the Báb, Baháʼu'lláh, ʻAbdu'l-Bahá, the central figures of the Baháʼí Faith, which are used extensively by Baháʼís in their devotional life. These prayers, encompassing many topics that include meetings, times of day, and healing, are held in high esteem. The specific words are believed by many Baháʼís to have special power. Group reading from prayer books is a common feature of Baháʼí gatherings. Commonly, Baháʼís gather informally in each other's homes to read prayers in events known as devotionals. Participants in a devotional gathering take turns reading aloud from a prayer book, while the others listen in reverent silence.

General teachings
Baháʼu'lláh, the founder of the Baháʼí Faith, encouraged Baháʼís to pray frequently; he wrote that prayer should be used both individually as an act of worship in turning to God, and collectively in meetings. The Baháʼí writings state that prayer is essential to the development of spirituality, and that it is natural to have the impulse to pray. The benefit of prayer, however, is not obtained by the act of praying itself, but the spiritual state induced by prayer. In that regard, Baháʼu'lláh wrote that a brief prayer that is joyful is better to a long prayer which does not induce a spiritual state; that it is the spirit in which the prayer is offered that is important.

In the Baháʼí writings, the purpose of prayer is to get closer to God and to Baháʼu'lláh and to help better their own conduct and to request divine assistance. Prayer is used to express an individual's love of God and to affect their inner self. Prayer can also be used to obtain specific material ends, but the Baháʼí writings state that it is more important to pray for the love of God without any other hope or fear. Baháʼu'lláh wrote that prayer is essential to any undertaking, and that it attracts confirmations from God.

The Baháʼí teachings state that individual prayer should be performed when one is alone, and when free of distractions such as early in the morning or late at night. Collective prayers, which usually are performed by individuals taking turns in reading prayers, are also encouraged; collective prayers are usually performed at the beginning of meetings such as Nineteen Day Feasts, and Baháʼí administrative meetings. Shoghi Effendi, the head of the Baháʼí Faith in the first half of the 20th century, wrote that prayers may be addressed to God, Baháʼu'lláh, or other Manifestations of God; he recommended, however, that the prayers be either directly or indirectly addressed to Baháʼu'lláh.

Obligatory Baháʼí prayers

In addition to general prayers, Baháʼu'lláh prescribed a daily obligatory prayer in his book of laws, the Kitáb-i-Aqdas. The obligatory prayer is a primary religious obligation starting at the age of fifteen and it is the most important kind of prayer. The purpose of the obligatory prayer is to foster the development of humility and devotion. Unlike almost all other prayers in the Baháʼí Faith, there are specific regulations concerning the obligatory prayers; however, obligatory prayer is a personal spiritual obligation and thus, no Baháʼí administrative sanction can be obtained if a Baháʼí fails to say his prayer daily.

Baháʼu'lláh wrote three obligatory prayers — the short, the medium and the long — and Baháʼís are free to choose to say one of the three each day.  The short and the medium prayer have to be said at specific times; the short has to be said once between noon and sunset and the medium has to be said three times daily: once between sunrise and noon, once between noon and sunset and once between sunset and two hours after sunset. The long prayer can be said at any time in the day.  The medium and long prayers also include movements and gestures during the prayers, which are themselves obligatory except when a person is physically incapable of performing them. Shoghi Effendi has written that the motions and gestures are symbolic and are used to help concentration during the prayers. Furthermore, the obligatory prayer is to be preceded by ablutions — the cleaning of the hands and face.

During obligatory prayers Baháʼís face the Qiblih, which is the Shrine of Baháʼu'lláh, comparable in practice to Muslims facing the Kaaba during daily prayer, or Christians/Jews facing Jerusalem. The Báb changed the direction of prayer to He whom God shall make manifest, a role claimed by Baháʼu'lláh. Baháʼís during his lifetime prayed facing the person of Bahá'u'lláh, until the spot became fixed when he was buried. A Tablet explaining this existed but had been stolen by Covenant-breakers.

Corpus of general prayers
Baháʼu'lláh, the Báb — who told of Baháʼu'lláh's coming — and ʻAbdu'l-Baha wrote hundreds of prayers; many of these prayers were originally included in letters to individuals. Most of these prayers were written in Arabic and Persian, and ʻAbdu'l-Baha wrote a few in Turkish.  In 1900 the first English language prayer book was published under the title Tablets, Communes and Holy Utterances. Since then, a large number of prayers have been translated into English and many hundreds of languages; by 1983 the short obligatory prayer has been translated into 501 languages.

Prayers have been written for awakening, for travelling, healing, spiritual growth, detachment, protection, forgiveness, assistance, and unity, among others. The prayers may be said aloud, sung and/or repeated, and the text should not be changed. When saying a general prayer, one does not need to face the Qiblih.

Baháʼí prayers vary considerably in form; however a typical prayer starts with the supplication of the attributes of God, then a statement of praise, and then a request such as guidance or protection. The end of the prayer is usually composed of a list of God's attributes. The prayers often use imagery, including references to Islamic literature and Persian poetry.

Other special prayers
There also exist a number of prayers which can be said in specific circumstances or occasions, and they include prayers for the fast, and specific Baháʼí holy days; these prayers, while not obligatory, have an importance nearly equal to that of the obligatory prayers. Three other prayers are often seen by Baháʼís to have particular power, including the Báb's short prayer for the removal of difficulties, and the Tablet of Ahmad and the Long Healing Prayer, both by Baháʼu'lláh. There is also a prayer for protection from "calamity and pestilence" (epidemics). 

The Tablet of Visitation is a prayer that is used during visits to the Shrine of Baháʼu'lláh and of the Báb, and is also used during Baháʼí holy days associated with them; the tablet is composed of passages taken from several of Baháʼu'lláh's writings. There is also a Tablet of Visitation for ʻAbdu'l-Bahá which is a prayer that expresses humility and selflessness. Baháʼu'lláh also wrote a specific prayer for the dead, which is to be said before the interment of a Baháʼí who has reached the age of fifteen. The prayer is read aloud by a single person while others who are present stand in silence; the prayer is the only Baháʼí congregational prayer.

The Greatest Name
It is obligatory for the Baháʼís to repeat the phrase "Alláh-u-Abhá", a form of the Greatest Name, 95 times per day, as described by Baháʼu'lláh in the Kitáb-i-Aqdas, sometimes using prayer beads.

Meditation

In the Bahá'í teachings, meditation is a primary tool for spiritual development, involving reflection on the words of God. While prayer and meditation are linked, where meditation happens generally in a prayerful attitude, prayer is seen specifically as turning toward God, and meditation is seen as a communion with one's self where one focuses on the divine.

The purpose of meditation is to strengthen one's understanding of the words of God, and to make one's soul more susceptible to their potentially transformative power, more receptive to the need for both prayer and meditation to bring about and maintain a spiritual communion with God.

Bahá'u'lláh never specified any particular form of meditation, and thus each person is free to choose their own form. However, he did state that Baháʼís should read a passage of the Baháʼí writings twice a day, once in the morning, and once in the evening, and meditate on it. He also encouraged people to reflect on one's actions and worth at the end of each day. During the Nineteen Day Fast, a period of the year during which Baháʼís adhere to a sunrise-to-sunset fast, they meditate and pray to reinvigorate their spiritual forces.

See also
God in the Baháʼí Faith

Notes

References

Further reading
 Bahá'í World Centre (2019). Prayer and Devotional Life (compilation).

External links
Bahaiprayers.org - A collection of Baha'i prayers
BahaiPrayers.net  - Baháʼí prayers in 60+ languages (incl. apps)
Short Obligatory Prayer in many languages
Bahai.org: Prayer, Meditation, and Fasting
The Importance of Obligatory Prayer and Fasting - a compilation from the Baháʼí writings, compiled by the Research Department of the Universal House of Justice
'Questions on Obligatory Prayer and Repetition of the Greatest Name Ninety-five Times a Day', by the Research Department of the Universal House of Justice
 Names of God (a list of some of the names of God from English translations of the Baháʼí Writings, compiled by Romane Takkenberg)
 Compendium on Baháʼí Prayer